This is a list of Malayalam films that released in 2020.

Released films
The list of released films.

References

2020
Lists of 2020 films by country or language
 2020
2020 in Indian cinema